Olmsted Falls City School District is a public school district in Olmsted Falls, Ohio.

Schools 
The district includes the following schools:
 Olmsted Falls High School
 Olmsted Falls Middle School
 Olmsted Falls Intermediate School
 Falls-Lenox Primary School
 Early Childhood Center (preschool & kindergarten)

External links

References

School districts in Cuyahoga County, Ohio